The Asian Le Mans Series (AsLMS) is an Asian sports car racing endurance series created by the Automobile Club de l'Ouest (ACO) and based in Asia. It is the successor to the defunct Japan Le Mans Challenge which folded in 2007 after its second season. The ACO aims to attract teams and drivers from Asian countries.

A teasing race was to be held in Shanghai, China on November 1–2, 2008 but was later cancelled. The inaugural season's race, the 2009 1000 km of Okayama, was held on 30 October and 1 November 2009 at Okayama, Japan with one 500 km race per day. It was the only event of the inaugural season. A second Asian Le Mans Series event, scheduled for the Shanghai International Circuit, China, on 7 and 8 November was cancelled by the ACO due to economic circumstances. The winning teams in each of the four categories (LMP1, LMP2, GT1 and GT2) earned automatic invitations to the 2010 24 Hours of Le Mans. The series was relaunched for the 2013 season with an announcement at the 2012 24 Hours of Le Mans.

History
Following the end of the All Japan Sports Prototype Championship (JSPC) in 1992 there was no major endurance series involving sports-prototypes in Asia, although there was a grand tourer championship in the All Japan Grand Touring Car Championship (JGTC), the predecessor to today's Super GT series.

Plans for a new endurance championship were initially conceived by Don Panoz and backed by the ACO in 2000 with plans for an Asian-Pacific Le Mans Series, modeled after his American Le Mans Series and planned European Le Mans Series for 2001. Two previews of this event were held. The 1999 Le Mans Fuji 1000km at the Fuji Speedway in Japan combined Le Mans cars with JGTC machines for automatic entries to the 2000 24 Hours of Le Mans. This idea was followed by the American Le Mans Series with the 2000 Race of a Thousand Years race at the Adelaide Street Circuit in Australia. These two events served as a precursor to the planned APLMS series, and at the time of the creation of ELMS, Don Panoz announced his intention to hold an exhibition APLMS race at Sepang International Circuit in Malaysia in late 2001.

However, the European Le Mans Series suffered from a lack of entrants during its debut season and was eventually canceled. Don Panoz decided that the APLMS would likely have even less interest. Thus the APLMS exhibition race and all plans for an Asian series were scrapped.

The ACO attempted to develop their own championship modeled on their own Le Mans Endurance Series in 2006 with the development of the Japan Le Mans Challenge, overseen by the Sports Car Endurance Race Operation (SERO). It too lacked competitors and was canceled after its second season.

In 2009, a reborn Asian Le Mans Series held an inaugural event in Okayama, Japan with two 500 km races.  A 1000 km race in Zhuhai, China, was held as part of the Intercontinental Le Mans Cup in 2010, and it was also part of the Asian Le Mans Series.

At the 2012 24 Hours of Le Mans the ACO announced the revival of the Asian Le Mans Series for the 2013 series. The format will be run very similarly to the European Le Mans Series, with the ACO expecting around 16-18 cars for the first relaunched season. However, only 8 cars showed up for the first race of the season, making it the smallest ever grid in ACO sanctioned racing. This record was broken a year later when only six cars started the first race of the 2014 season at Inje.

The ACO further announced that cars running under the GT300 regulations in the Japanese Super GT series would be eligible to enter in the Asian Le Mans Series' GTC class, with organisers from both series working together to create calendars that would allow GT300 teams to compete in both championships.

Following the end of the 2014 season, the ACO took over as the organizer for the series from the S2M Group. A primary issue that supported the takeover included low car counts for the season which prompted the cancellation of a scheduled round in Thailand and limited the series to grow while only in its second year. Plans for 2015 include a three-race calendar to begin later in the year around September then expand to five rounds in 2016 with the first race in the spring. One round will be held on the same weekend as the FIA World Endurance Championship, similar to the double-headers it shares with the European Le Mans Series and the WeatherTech SportsCar Championship. Class structure will remain unchanged.

In October 2016, the Asian Le Mans Series announced a partnership with the GT Asia Series. It includes a new Michelin Asia GT Challenge, which is a combined classification for GT3 teams, where the winner will get an invitation to the 24 Hours of Le Mans.

In January 2020, the Asian Le Mans Series hosted its first race outside the continent of Asia at Tailem Bend Motorsport Park, Australia known as the 4 Hours of The Bend.

In the 2021 season from February 13th-20th, the series marked its first venture to the Middle East racing in the United Arab Emirates for two 4 Hours of Dubai races at the Dubai Autodrome followed by two 4 Hours of Abu Dhabi races at the Yas Marina Circuit. Since then, the championship have been run entirely within the country.

Format
The relaunched Asian Le Mans series has very similar rules to the European Le Mans Series with a total of four classes: LMP2, LMPC, GTC, and GTC Am.

Compared to its running in 2009 the LMP1 and LMGT1 categories are dropped. The GTC class is opened to GT3 category cars in addition to Super GT series GT300 teams. All classes follow a "Pro-Am" categorization with each car requiring at least one amateur-rated driver, and each car must have at least one driver of Asian nationality. The season champions of LMP2 and GTC receive an invitation to the following year's 24 Hours of Le Mans. Michelin is the sole tire supplier for the series.

In the 2013 season the SGT class was opened exclusively for all teams in GT300 class of Super GT. It used the same vehicle regulation of Super GT and counted towards the GT300 championship. This class only participated at the 2013 3 Hours of Fuji.

On 20 April 2013, changes were made to the class structure for grand touring. GTC remained open to FIA GT3 category cars while GTC Am was introduced as a trophy to gentleman drivers and teams that competed from Lamborghini Super Trofeo, Porsche Carrera Cup Asia, Ferrari Challenge Asia-Pacific, Audi R8 LMS Cup Asia, and Lotus Cup Asia. The class was renamed GT Am the following season.

For the 2014 season, Group CN was admitted into the series replacing the entry-less LMPC class from 2013. The grand tourer classes including LM GTE, GTC, and Super GT300 were merged into a single GT class. Driver requirements to include one driver from Asia were expanded to include any nationality from the Australasia region.

In 2015 the season format was changed to a winter one spanning two calendar years. The LMP3 class was added and the GT class was split in GT and GT Am.

In the 2016–17 season the GT Cup class replaced GT Am.

In the 2017–18 season CN was dropped and GT Am was back.

In the 2018–19 season the new LMP2 cars homologated after the ACO's 2017 regulations were eligible for the LMP2 class and the earlier LMP2 cars were eligible for the new LMP2 Am class.

The GT Cup class would be dropped in the 2019–20 season.

ACO's Generation II 2020 Regulation Built LMP3 Cars from manufacturers such as Ligier, ADESS, Ginetta & Duqueine Engineering were now eligible in the series starting in the 2021 season. The calendar would also return to an annual format instead of spanning two calendar years since back in the 2015-16 season due to the ongoing COVID-19 pandemic.

In the 2023 season of the Asian Le Mans Series, a bronze pro-am rated driver would be mandatory in each class for the first time. Therefore the LMP2 Am & GT Am Classes would officially be dropped.

Champions

Drivers

Teams

References

External links

 

 
Sports car racing series
Asian auto racing series
Group GT3